David Hill,  (born on 13 May 1957 in Carlisle, Cumberland) is a choral conductor and organist.
Beginning July 2013, he holds an appointment to the Yale Institute of Sacred Music.
His highest-profile roles are as Chief Conductor of the BBC Singers from September 2007 until 2017, and Musical Director of The Bach Choir since April 1998.

He also holds the positions Chief Conductor of the Southern Sinfonia, Music Director of the Leeds Philharmonic Society, Associate Conductor of the Bournemouth Symphony Orchestra and President of Bath Bach Choir.

Hill is President of the Incorporated Association of Organists, succeeding Catherine Ennis.

He was appointed a Member of the Order of the British Empire (MBE) in the 2019 New Year Honours for services to music.
He had a part in Coronation Street in 1970 where he broke into the vestry to play the organ and was befriended by Ena Sharples.

Past career

Hill was educated at Chetham's School of Music and St John's College, Cambridge, where he was Organ Scholar under George Guest. He spent two years from 1980 as Sub-Organist at Durham Cathedral, under Richard Hey Lloyd.

He was Master of Music at Westminster Cathedral from 1982–1987, then at Winchester Cathedral from 1987-2002, before returning to St John's College, Cambridge as Director of Music from 2003-2007.

References

External links
St John's College, Cambridge Choir homepage
BBC announcement of Chief Conductorship
The Bach Choir homepage

1957 births
English classical organists
British male organists
Cathedral organists
English conductors (music)
British male conductors (music)
Living people
Grammy Award winners
People from Carlisle, Cumbria
People educated at Chetham's School of Music
Alumni of St John's College, Cambridge
Bach musicians
21st-century British conductors (music)
Members of the Order of the British Empire
21st-century organists
Male classical organists